Omar Al-Aswad is a Libyan politician who has been serving on the Presidential Council of Libya since 2016. He represents the western town of Zintan, which is a powerful political faction in the country.

References

20th-century births
Living people
Government ministers of Libya
Members of the Presidential Council (Libya)
People from Jabal al Gharbi District
Year of birth missing (living people)